Predetermined variables are variables that were determined prior to the current period. In econometric models this implies that the current period error term is uncorrelated with current and lagged values of the predetermined variable but may be correlated with future values. This is a weaker restriction than strict exogeneity, which requires the variable to be uncorrelated with past, present, and future shocks.

A common example of a predetermined variable is consumption in models with credit constraints and rational expectations. Here, consumption is predetermined but not strictly exogenous. An unpredictable negative income shock will be uncorrelated with past (and potentially current) consumption, but will surely be correlated with future consumption—the individual will be forced to adjust their future consumption to accommodate their poorer state, inducing correlation. If the shock affects current consumption, predeterminedness (defined now as lags only) provides potential instruments--lagged values of the variable.

Predeterminedness, or sequential exogeneity, is commonly invoked in dynamic panel models.

Predetermined variables can be shown as: E(uis|xit) =0 where s > t.

The presence of predetermined variables is a motivating factor in the Arellano–Bond estimator.

References

Econometric models